The Strain is an American horror drama television series that premiered on FX on July 13, 2014. It was created by Guillermo del Toro and Chuck Hogan, based on their novel trilogy of the same name. Carlton Cuse served as executive producer and showrunner.

Series overview

Episodes

Season 1 (2014)

Season 2 (2015)

Season 3 (2016)

Season 4 (2017)

Ratings

References

External links
 

Lists of American drama television series episodes